"Hell on Wheels" is a disco song performed by American singer-actress Cher from her sixteenth studio album, Prisoner. It was written by Bob Esty and Michele Aller and produced by Esty. It was released as the album's first and only international single in late 1979. The song was also added to the Roller Boogie soundtrack in 1979. Lyrically, the track is about "follow what you like".

"Hell on Wheels" initially received mixed reviews from critics, but in 1999 Randy Cordova from The Arizona Republic praised the song, calling it a "roller-disco anthem". Cher starred in a short film that Casablanca Records wanted to promote her single with. After releasing the promotional film, Cher began making music videos.

Background
According to J. Randy Taraborrelli 's biography, "Hell on Wheels" was recorded because Cher admitted to being a roller-skating fanatic. The single was released with "Git Down (Guitar Groupie)", a song from the album Take Me Home on its B-side. Both songs were released as a 12" extended version and both versions are not yet released on CD.

In 1979, "Hell on Wheels" was included in original motion picture soundtrack to the film Roller Boogie as the track number one. After the released of the soundtrack album, "Hell on Wheels" was released in Japan with a different artwork, featuring a photo of Cher bottom center, taken from the After Dark magazine, and with a still of Linda Blair and Jim Bray. The song was released with "Git Down (Guitar Groupie)" on its B-side. Strangely "Git Down (Guitar Groupie)" in the Japanese single was a "Theme from Roller Boogie", despite the song never appeared in the movie or in the soundtrack album.

Despite a worldwide commercial release, "Hell on Wheels" did not manage to achieve any success other than charting only on the Billboard Hot 100, and peaking at a disappointing number fifty-nine. "Hell On Wheels" was also her last hit for Casablanca Records.

"Hell on Wheels" was used as the theme song for Michael Kors' Fall 2019 campaign ad with Bella Hadid and Mayowa Nicholas.

Critical reception

"Hell on Wheels" received mixed reviews from critics. The review of the Los Angeles Times newspaper describes the song as the best cut of the album and noted "'Hell on Wheels', latches onto the roller-skating craze as tenaciously-and stylishly-as the Beach Boys latched onto surfing. Joel Flegler of the Fanfare Magazine, while reviewing the Roller Boogie soundtrack gave a negative review for all the songs, using the word 'worse' in reference to the length of the album. Another critic said that every song of the album had the same rock influence, and about the song said that was "her trendy roller-disco effort".

Music video
The video for "Hell on Wheels" was tough for Cher to shoot. She was required to skate down steep, mountainous roads while sporting a broken arm. In the video, Cher is roller skating and being followed by a huge truck driven by two men which use the maximum speed of the truck to catch up with her. Following this, Cher convinces many people with different types of transportation to follow and take a ride with her.

"Hell on Wheels" was Cher's first professional video. Some consider "Take Me Home" to be her first professional clip, though this was lifted from her highly rated 1979 TV special Cher...and Other Fantasies. "Hell on Wheels" is one of the 1970s pioneer music videos to be produced in the MTV style before MTV itself existed, and now it is considered to be one of the first modern music videos.

The video was premiered on the late night NBC television show The Midnight Special. Promotional clips were also shown during a 1979 interview with Phil Donahue on The Phil Donahue Show. Despite that "Hell on Wheels" was her first official music video released it was never released on her best video collection.

Personnel
Cher – main vocals
Michelle Aller – background vocals
Richard Tee – Hammond B3 organ
Mike Baird – drums
John Pierce – bass guitar
Steve Lukather, Ira Newborn – guitar
Dan Wyman – synthesizer, programming
Bob Esty – piano, synthesizer, background vocals
Alan Estes, Oliver C. Brown – percussion
Sid Sharp – concertmaster

Technical
Larry Emerine – co-producer, engineer
Harry Langdon – photography

Charts

References

External links
Official website of Cher

1979 singles
Cher songs
Casablanca Records singles
Articles containing video clips
Songs written by Bob Esty
1979 songs